Cecilia Metra is an electrical engineer at the Università di Bologna, Italy. She was named a Fellow of the Institute of Electrical and Electronics Engineers (IEEE) in 2014 for her contributions to the online testing and fault-tolerant design of digital circuits and systems.

References

External links 

 University of Bologna faculty page

Fellow Members of the IEEE
Living people
Engineers from Bologna
Year of birth missing (living people)
Academic staff of the University of Bologna